Alejandra María Silva García-Baquero (born 16 February 1983) is a Spanish publicist and political activist.

Early career 
Silva worked as an intern in The Farm ad agency in Madrid, and in 2005 she accepted a position in sales and marketing at a private firm in the airplane industry.

Personal life 
Silva is the daughter of Ignacio Silva, a businessman and the former Vice President of Real Madrid Football Club.

Silva and first husband Govind Friedland, a mining magnate, had son Albert in December 2012. The couple were in the process of divorce by October 2015, by which time Silva was in a relationship with actor Richard Gere, a longtime family friend. She and Gere married in April 2018 at Gere's estate in Pound Ridge, New York. The couple had a son, Alexander, in early February 2019. In April 2020, it was reported that Silva had given birth to a third son.

Philanthropy 
In 2007, Silva promoted a nonprofit initiative jointly with Karolina Kurkova called Beautiful Life Fund, which raises awareness of the plight of children in need, distressed refugee children, victims of war, and the education of homeless children around the world.

In 2010, she participated in the Real Madrid Football Club Foundation African Initiative Project by creating soccer leagues as means of integrating underprivileged children to their local communities and promoting sports and its values amongst African families.

Through her interest in nonprofit organizations, Silva met American actor Richard Gere and began a relationship. As of 2016, Silva continues her activism in nonprofit organization and supports The Rais Foundation for the Homeless.

In 2016, she was the cover model of Hola! Fashion.

References

External links 

Living people
Activists from Galicia (Spain)
Spanish women activists
Spanish businesspeople
Public relations people
Spanish expatriates in England
Place of birth missing (living people)
1983 births